Sorcerer is an album recorded in May 1967 by the Miles Davis quintet. It is the third of six albums that this quintet recorded.  It also includes one track from a 1962 session with vocalist Bob Dorough, which was the first time Wayne Shorter recorded with Davis. Davis does not play on the second track, "Pee Wee". The album's cover is a profile photo of actress Cicely Tyson, who at the time was Davis's girlfriend (and later his wife).

Songs 
The only tune from the album known to have appeared in Davis's live performances is "Masqualero", written by Wayne Shorter. Davis's groups performed it as part of the concerts documented on Live in Europe 1967, Live in Europe 1969, It's About that Time (recorded in March 1970), and Black Beauty (recorded in April 1970). The tune is also featured on Chick Corea's Piano Improvisations Vol. 2 (recorded in 1971), and was revived by Wayne Shorter nearly thirty years later, appearing on Footprints Live! (recorded in 2001), featuring his acoustic quartet.

The CD reissue includes alternate takes of "Masqualero" and "Limbo". The alternate take of "Limbo" was recorded in Los Angeles on May 9, several days before the final take was recorded in New York City. This take also replaces Ron Carter with bassist Buster Williams. Both versions of "Masqualero" were recorded on the same date and with the same personnel.

Critical reception 
Sorcerer has been acclaimed by critics. Reviewing in January 1968 for DownBeat, Bill Quinn observed a transition from the "big old fat old lazy melodies" of Davis' traditional bop past toward an "extraordinarily sophisticated route to expression" defined more by inflection, nuance, and "quality of the mood". He credited Davis with "unselfishly [taking] advantage of the writing talent in his crew" and being "right on top of the times with superbly disciplined chaos". Robert Christgau considered it among the "great work" Davis recorded with his quintet of the 1960s, although he would later say that "the late-'60[s] Wayne Shorter edition of Miles's band is my least favorite Miles—not that I think it's bad, but I've always found Shorter too cool." Stephen Thomas Erlewine of AllMusic also acknowledged that "it's a little elusive" and "rarely blows hot", representing a period of transition yet still "a layered, intriguing work".

Track listing
Columbia – CS 9532

Personnel
 Miles Davis – trumpet
 Wayne Shorter – tenor saxophone
 Herbie Hancock – piano
 Ron Carter – double bass
 Tony Williams – drums
 
The lineup differs greatly on the track "Nothing Like You", since it was recorded several years prior:

 Miles Davis – trumpet
 Wayne Shorter – tenor saxophone
 Bob Dorough – vocals
 Gil Evans – arrangements
 Frank Rehak – trombone
 Paul Chambers – bass
 Jimmy Cobb – drums
 Willie Bobo (William Correa) – bongos

References

External links 
 

1967 albums
Miles Davis albums
Columbia Records albums
Albums produced by Teo Macero
Albums recorded at CBS 30th Street Studio
Instrumental albums